The ImageRoot Museum is a museum in Seoul, South Korea.

See also
List of museums in South Korea

External links

Art museums and galleries in Seoul